Domenico de Simone (29 November 1768–9 November 1837) was an Italian cardinal. He was part of the Roman Curia.

He was born in Benevento and died in Rome.

He was made a cardinal in March 1830 by Pope Pius VIII and took part in the 1830–1831 conclave which chose Pope Gregory XVI.

References

19th-century Italian cardinals
1768 births
1837 deaths
People from Benevento